Wawawai County Park is a county park at Wawawai in Whitman County, Washington, United States.

References

Parks in Whitman County, Washington